The 1982 World Series of Poker (WSOP) was a series of poker tournaments held at Binion's Horseshoe.

Preliminary events

Main Event

There were 104 entrants to the Main Event. This Main Event was the first to exceed 100 entries. Each paid $10,000 to enter the tournament. Jack Straus (pair of 10's) beat Dewey Tomko (pair of 4's) to win the 1982 title; earlier in the tournament, Straus had been down to one chip.

Final table

Other High Finishes

NB: This list is restricted to top 30 finishers with an existing Wikipedia entry.

The wristwatch
Due to early criticism that the bracelets were too feminine and that no male winners wore them, the WSOP replaced the bracelets with golden wristwatches in 1982.  The wristwatches were unpopular, and, as a result, the bracelets were brought back in 1983.

References

World Series of Poker
World Series of Poker